All Quiet on the Western Front is a 1930 American pre-Code epic anti-war film based on the 1929 novel of the same name by German novelist Erich Maria Remarque. Directed by Lewis Milestone, it stars Lew Ayres, Louis Wolheim, John Wray, Arnold Lucy, and Ben Alexander.

All Quiet on the Western Front opened to wide acclaim in the United States. Considered a realistic and harrowing account of warfare in World War I, it made the American Film Institute's first 100 Years...100 Movies list in 1997. A decade later, after the same organization polled over 1,501 workers in the creative community, All Quiet on the Western Front was ranked the seventh-best American epic film. In 1990, the film was selected and preserved by the United States Library of Congress' National Film Registry as being deemed "culturally, historically, or aesthetically significant". The film was the first to win the Academy Awards for both Outstanding Production and Best Director. It is the first Best Picture winner based on a novel.

Its sequel, The Road Back (1936), portrays members of the 2nd Company returning home after the war.

Plot
Professor Kantorek gives an impassioned speech to his German students about the glory of serving in the Army and "saving the Fatherland". On the brink of becoming men, the boys in his class, led by Paul Bäumer, are moved to join the army as the new 2nd Company.  Their romantic delusions are quickly broken during their brief but rigorous training under the abusive Corporal Himmelstoss.

The new soldiers arrive by train at the chaotic combat zone. One in the group is killed before the recruits can reach their post, to the alarm of one of the new soldiers (Behn). The new soldiers are assigned to a unit composed of older, unwelcoming veterans. Having not eaten in days, they pay cigarettes to Corporal "Kat" Katzinsky (who has stolen a slaughtered hog from a field kitchen) in exchange for a meal.

The recruits' first trip to the trenches with the veterans is a harrowing experience, during which Behn is killed. A depiction of trench warfare follows with many casualties on both sides. Eventually, they are sent back to the field kitchens to get their rations; each man receives double helpings, simply because of the number of dead.

They hear that they are to return to the front the next day and begin a semi-serious discussion about the causes of the war and of wars in general.

One day, Corporal Himmelstoss arrives at the front and is immediately spurned because of his bad reputation. He is forced to go over the top with the 2nd Company and is promptly killed. In an attack on a cemetery, Paul stabs a French soldier and is distraught as he spends the night trapped in a hole with the dying man. He tries and fails to save him, and begs for forgiveness. Later, he returns to the German lines and is comforted by Kat.

Going back to the front line, Paul is severely wounded and taken to a Catholic hospital, along with his good friend, Albert Kropp. Kropp's leg is amputated and Paul is taken to the bandaging ward, from which, according to its reputation, nobody has ever returned alive. Still, he later returns to the normal rooms triumphantly, only to find Kropp in depression.

Paul is given a furlough and visits his family at home.  He is shocked by how uninformed and optimistic everyone is about the war's actual situation. When Paul visits the schoolroom where he was originally recruited, he shares his experiences and disillusionment with the war to Professor Kantorek and his young students, who call him a "coward". 

Disillusioned and angry, Paul returns to the front and comes upon another 2nd Company filled with new young recruits, who are now also disillusioned. He discusses the people's inability to comprehend the futility of the war with Kat. Kat's shin is broken when a bomb dropped by an aircraft falls nearby, so Paul carries him back to a field hospital, only to find that a second explosion has killed Kat. Crushed by the loss of his mentor, Paul leaves.

In the final scene, Paul is back on the front line. He sees a butterfly just beyond his trench. Smiling, he reaches out for the butterfly. While reaching, however, he is shot and killed by an enemy sniper. The final sequence shows the 2nd Company arriving at the front for the first time, fading out to the image of a cemetery.

Cast

 Lew Ayres as Paul Bäumer
 Louis Wolheim as Stanislaus Katczinsky
 John Wray as Himmelstoss
 Arnold Lucy as Professor Kantorek
 Ben Alexander as Franz Kemmerich
 Scott Kolk as Leer
 Owen Davis, Jr. as Peter
 William Bakewell as Albert Kropp
 Russell Gleason as Müller
 Richard Alexander as Westhus
 Harold Goodwin as Detering
 Slim Summerville as Tjaden
 Walter Browne Rogers as Behn
 G. Pat Collins as Lieutenant Bertinck
 Edmund Breese as Herr Meyer, the Stammtisch speaker
 Beryl Mercer as Frau Bäumer, Paul's mother
 Marion Clayton as Erna, Paul's sister (uncredited)
 Heinie Conklin as Joseph Hammacher (uncredited)
 Bertha Mann as Sister Libertine, nurse (uncredited)
 Raymond Griffith as the killed French soldier (uncredited)
 William Irving as Ginger, the army cook (uncredited)
 Yola d'Avril as Suzanne (uncredited)
 Edwin Maxwell as Herr Bäumer (uncredited)
 Bodil Rosing as Mother of hospital patient (uncredited)
 Maurice Murphy as Soldier (uncredited)
 Arthur Gardner as classroom student (uncredited) (at the time of his death in December 2014, he was the last surviving member of the cast or crew)

Production
In the film, Paul is shot while reaching for a butterfly. This scene is different from the book, and was inspired by an earlier scene showing a butterfly collection in Paul's home. The scene was shot during the editing phase, so the actors were no longer available and Milestone had to use his own hand as Paul's.

Noted comedienne ZaSu Pitts was originally cast as Paul's mother and completed the film but preview audiences, used to seeing her in comic roles, laughed when she appeared onscreen so Milestone re-shot her scenes with Beryl Mercer before the film was released. The preview audience remains the only one who saw Pitts in the role, although she does appear for about 30 seconds in the film's original preview trailer.

The film was shot with two cameras side by side, with one negative edited as a sound film and the other edited as an "International Sound Version" for distribution in non-English speaking areas.

A great number of German Army veterans were living in Los Angeles at the time of filming and were recruited as bit players and technical advisers. Around 2,000 extras were utilized during production. Among them was future director Fred Zinnemann (High Noon, From Here to Eternity, A Man for All Seasons, Julia), who was fired for impudence.

Releases
The original international Sound Version of the film, lasting 152 minutes, was first shown in Los Angeles on April 21, 1930, and premiered in New York on April 25, 1930. This version has intertitles and a synchronized music and effects track. A sound version with dialogue was released in New York city on April 29, 1930. A 147-minute version was submitted to the British censors, which was cut to 145 minutes before the film premiered in London June 14, 1930. The film went on general release in the US on August 24, 1930. The sound version was re-released in 1939, though cut down to ten reels.

On its initial release, Variety wrote: 

Some of the credit for the film's success has been ascribed to the direction of Lewis Milestone:

Later re-releases were substantially cut and the film's ending scored with new music against the wishes of director Lewis Milestone. Before he died in 1980, Milestone requested that Universal fully restore the film with the removal of the end music cue. Two decades later, Milestone's wishes were finally granted when the United States Library of Congress undertook an exhaustive restoration of the film in 2006. This version incorporates all known surviving footage and is 133 minutes long.

Home video
Various edited versions have been distributed on video, including a Japanese subtitled Laserdisc with a running time of 103 minutes. The US Laserdisc from 1987 and the first US DVD, released in 1999, use the same unrestored 131-minute British release print. Since 2007, there have been numerous international releases of the 2006 Library of Congress restoration on DVD and Blu-ray. The latter format additionally contains a 133-minute restoration of the international sound version, albeit mislabelled as the "silent version".

Reception

Critical response 

All Quiet on the Western Front received tremendous praise in the United States. In the New York Daily News, Irene Thirer wrote: "It smack [sic] of directional geniusnothing short of this; sensitive performances by a marvelous cast and the most remarkable camera work which has been performed on either silent or sound screen, round about the Hollywood studios. [...] We have praise for everyone concerned with this picture." Variety lauded it as a "harrowing, gruesome, morbid tale of war, so compelling in its realism, bigness and repulsiveness".

In a retrospective review, American film critic Pauline Kael commented, "The year 1930 was, of course, a good year for pacifism, which always flourishes between wars; Milestone didn't make pacifist films during the Second World War—nor did anybody else working in Hollywood. And wasn't it perhaps easier to make All Quiet just because its heroes were German? War always seems like a tragic waste when told from the point of view of the losers."

Review aggregator Rotten Tomatoes reports an approval rating of 97% based on 77 reviews, with an average rating of 9.2/10. The site's critics' consensus reads: "Director Lewis Milestone's brilliant anti-war polemic, headlined by an unforgettable performance from Lew Ayres, lays bare the tragic foolishness at the heart of war." On Metacritic, the film has a score of 91 out of 100 based on 16 reviews, indicating "universal acclaim".

Controversy and bannings 
However, controversy would attend the film's subject matter elsewhere. Due to its anti-war and perceived anti-German messages, Adolf Hitler and the Nazi Party opposed the film. During and after its German premiere in Berlin on December 4, 1930, Nazi brownshirts under the command of Joseph Goebbels disrupted the viewings by setting off stink bombs, throwing sneezing powder in the air and releasing white mice in the theaters, eventually escalating to attacking audience members perceived to be Jewish and forcing projectors to shut down. They repeatedly yelled out "Judenfilm!" ("Jewish film!") while doing this.

Goebbels wrote about one such disruption in his personal diary:

The Nazi campaign was successful and German authorities outlawed the film on December 11, 1930. A heavily cut version was briefly allowed in 1931, before the Nazis came to power in 1933 and the film was outlawed again. The film was finally re-released in Germany on April 25, 1952, in the Capitol Theatre in West Berlin.

Between 1930 and 1941, this was one of many films to be banned in Victoria, Australia, on the ground of 'pacifism', by the Chief Censor Creswell O'Reilly. However, it was said to enjoy "a long and successful run" in other states, though the book was banned nationally. The film was also banned in Italy and Austria in 1931, with the prohibition officially raised only in the 1980s, and in France up to 1963.

Awards and honors

1929–1930 Academy Awards

It was the first talkie war film to win Oscars.

Other wins:
 1930 Photoplay Medal of Honor – Carl Laemmle Jr.
 1931 Kinema Junpo Award for Best Foreign Language Film – Sound to Lewis Milestone
 1990 National Film Registry

American Film Institute recognition
 100 Years...100 Movies – #54
 100 Years...100 Thrills – Nominated
 AFI's 100 Years... 100 Movie Quotes
 "And our bodies are earth. And our thoughts are clay. And we sleep and eat with death." – Nominated.
 100 Years...100 Movies (10th Anniversary Edition) – Nominated
 AFI's 10 Top 10 – #7 epic film

See also
 All Quiet on the Western Front (1979 film)
 All Quiet on the Western Front (2022 film)
 List of World War I films

References

Further reading
 Schleh, Eugene P. "All Quiet on the Western Front: A History Teacher's Reappraisal". Film & History 8.4 (1978): 66-69.
 Schleh, Eugene P. "Books About Film and War". Film & History: An Interdisciplinary Journal of Film and Television Studies 8.1 (1978): 11-14.
 Kelly, Andrew. All Quiet on the Western Front: The Story of a Film (1988).
 Chambers, John Whiteclay. "All Quiet on the Western Front (1930): the antiwar film and the image of the First World War". Historical journal of film, radio and television 14.4 (1994): 377-411.
 Wills, Gary. "All Quiet on the Western Front" (1998). National Film Registry. 
 Tibbetts, John C., and James M. Welsh, eds. The Encyclopedia of Novels Into Film (2nd ed. 2005): 14-15.
 Eagan, Daniel. "All Quiet on the Western Front". America's Film Legacy: The Authoritative Guide to the Landmark Movies in the National Film Registry (2010): 168-169  .

External links

 
 
 
 

1930 films
1930s historical films
American war drama films
American epic films
1930s English-language films
1930s French-language films
1930s German-language films
American black-and-white films
Anti-war films about World War I
War epic films
Western Front (World War I) films
Films based on German novels
Films based on military novels
Films based on works by Erich Maria Remarque
Best Picture Academy Award winners
Films whose director won the Best Directing Academy Award
Universal Pictures films
Films directed by Lewis Milestone
United States National Film Registry films
Film controversies
Film controversies in Poland
Political controversies in film
Obscenity controversies in film
1930 drama films
Photoplay Awards film of the year winners
Censored films
All Quiet on the Western Front
1930 war films
1930s American films
Films produced by Carl Laemmle Jr.